The 1988 Supercopa Sudamericana Finals was the final of the first ever Supercopa Libertadores football tournament. It was contested by Argentine club Racing and Brazilian club Cruzeiro. The first leg of the tie was played at Estadio Juan D. Perón, where Racing beat Cruzeiro 21. In the second leg, held in Mineirão stadium in Belo Horizonte, both teams tied 11.

Racing Club won the cup 3–1 on points (3–2 on aggregate), achieving their first Supercopa trophy and winning an international title for the first time since 1967.

Venues

Match details

First leg

Second leg

See also
1988 Supercopa Sudamericana
1988 Copa Libertadores Finals

References

Supercopa Libertadores Finals
2
s
s
s
s
Football in Avellaneda